Kristjan Glibo (born 1 April 1982 in Bruchsal) is a German football manager and former player who manages VfR Wormatia Worms. He played as a defender or defensive midfielder.

References

External links
 
 

1982 births
Living people
German footballers
1. FC Kaiserslautern players
1. FC Kaiserslautern II players
SSV Jahn Regensburg players
SV Wehen Wiesbaden players
SV Sandhausen players
Bundesliga players
2. Bundesliga players
3. Liga players
Association football defenders
Association football midfielders
People from Bruchsal
Sportspeople from Karlsruhe (region)
Footballers from Baden-Württemberg